Penshoppe is a casual wear retail brand based in the Philippines. Established in 1986, Penshoppe is the flagship brand of Golden ABC, Inc., a fashion house based in the Philippines.

Brand history

Philippines
Established in Cebu in 1986, the brand initially established itself in the Visayas and Mindanao markets. Penshoppe then expanded to Metro Manila, with its first boutique opening its doors in SM City North EDSA in 1991. Since then, Penshoppe's network of stores has grown to over 300 sites.

International expansion
In 2015, Penshoppe opened retail outlets in Bahrain, Cambodia, Indonesia, Saudi Arabia, and UAE.

Marketing

Endorsements
Penshoppe previously had Nikki Gil-Albert, Jesli Hetutua, Heart Evangelista-Escudero and Jericho Rosales as their "local celebrity models". Some of the current local celebrity endorsers include Mikael Daez, Victor Basa, Bea Soriano, and Akihiro Sato.

The brand previously had Mandy Moore as a celebrity endorser in 2001. In 2011, the brand signed Gossip Girl Ed Westwick as an international celebrity endorser. Thai actor Mario Maurer become an international endorser for this clothing brand. In April 2012, the company announced that Zac Efron joined in as an endorser. In May 2012, American actor and model Ian Somerhalder, a.k.a. Damon Salvatore of The CW Television Network's The Vampire Diaries, announced as an endorser. In May 2012, Leighton Meester, also a Gossip Girl cast member, became an endorser for Penhshoppe's campaign called "All Stars". 

On September 6, 2014, supermodel Cara Delevingne was named as Penshoppe's newest endorser. 

In 2015, Sean O'Pry became a Penshoppe ambassador.  On May 6, 2015, Penshoppe revealed that fashion model and television personality Kendall Jenner had joined the clothing line's endorsing team. On August 27, 2015, via Penshoppe  announced that 2NE1's vocalist, Sandara Park, also joined as an ambassador. In early 2016, Penshoppe signed male model's new "It Boy", Lucky Blue Smith. In May 2016, American fashion model Gigi Hadid became the new face for Penshoppe. In 2017, Nam Joo-hyuk and the daughter of supermodel Cindy Crawford, Kaia Gerber, became the faces of Penshoppe. In March 2018, Penshoppe announced Zayn Malik, a former member of One Direction, returned as an endorser alongside Bella Hadid, Jordan Barrett, and Cameron Dallas for their latest campaign. In 2019, Lalisa Manoban, Thai member of girl group BLACKPINK, became Penshoppe's newest ambassador. In 2021, Astro's Cha Eun-woo joined Penshoppe as an ambassador. On May 26, 2022 Penshoppe announced NCT Dream, K-pop boy group under SM Entertainment, as an ambassador.

References

External links

Models.com Profile

Clothing brands of the Philippines